In thermodynamics, an isochoric process, also called a constant-volume process, an isovolumetric process, or an isometric process, is a thermodynamic process during which the volume of the closed system undergoing such a process remains constant. An isochoric process is exemplified by the heating or the cooling of the contents of a sealed, inelastic container: The thermodynamic process is the addition or removal of heat; the isolation of the contents of the container establishes the closed system; and the inability of the container to deform imposes the constant-volume condition. The isochoric process here should be a quasi-static process.

Formalism
An isochoric thermodynamic quasi-static process is characterized by constant volume, i.e., .
The process does no pressure-volume work, since such work is defined by

where  is pressure. The sign convention is such that positive work is performed by the system on the environment.

If the process is not quasi-static, the work can perhaps be done in a volume constant thermodynamic process.

For a reversible process, the first law of thermodynamics gives the change in the system's internal energy:

Replacing work with a change in volume gives

Since the process is isochoric, the previous equation now gives

Using the definition of specific heat capacity at constant volume, where  is the mass of the gas, we get

Integrating both sides yields

We conclude with:

On a pressure volume diagram, an isochoric process appears as a straight vertical line.  Its thermodynamic conjugate, an isobaric process would appear as a straight horizontal line.

Ideal gas
If an ideal gas is used in an isochoric process, and the quantity of gas stays constant, then the increase in energy is proportional to an increase in temperature and pressure. For example a gas heated in a rigid container: the pressure and temperature of the gas will increase, but the volume will remain the same.

Ideal Otto cycle
The ideal Otto cycle is an example of an isochoric process when it is assumed that the burning of the gasoline-air mixture in an internal combustion engine car is instantaneous. There is an increase in the temperature and the pressure of the gas inside the cylinder while the volume remains the same.

Etymology
The noun "isochor" and the adjective "isochoric" are derived from the Greek words ἴσος (isos) meaning "equal", and χώρα (khṓra) meaning "space."

See also
 Isobaric process
 Adiabatic process
 Cyclic process
 Isothermal process
 Polytropic process

References

Thermodynamic processes